

The CEA-309 Mehari is a Brazilian single-seat, monoplane sports aircraft developed by CEA.

Design and development
In 2003 the project was started, with the participation of numerous engineers and students. The wing and empennage assembly was first made of wood for the aerodynamic testing process. The fuselage was made of steel tubes, welded with the gas tungsten arc welding process.

The airplane has received a Lycoming engine, and its propellers are from MT-Propeller, and the avionics are from Harman Becker Automotive Systems. FIBRAER, a Brazilian aeronautical company, supplied all the hardware.

The first flight took place in Conselheiro Lafaiete, on August 5, 2009.

Specification

See also

References

External links
 

2000s Brazilian sport aircraft
Low-wing aircraft
Single-engined tractor aircraft
T-tail aircraft
Aircraft first flown in 2009